WTVM/WRBL/WVRK Tower, also known as the WTVM TV Mast, is a 533-meter guyed mast used for television broadcasting by WTVM, WRBL and FM radio broadcasting by WVRK-FM.

At the time of its completion during 1962, the WTVM/WRBL/WVRK tower was the tallest structure in the world. However, during 1963, the WIMZ-FM tower in Knoxville, Tennessee exceeded it.

Presently, despite being comparable in height to the Willis Tower in Chicago, the WTVM/WRBL/WVRK tower is not even the tallest structure in Cusseta, Georgia. During 2005, the Cusseta Richland Towers Tower, a 538.2 meter guyed mast situated at 32°19′16.4″N, 84°47′28.2″W, surpassed it in height.

See also 
 WTVM
 WRBL
 WVRK-FM
 List of masts
 List of tallest structures in the world

References

External links 
 FCC-Entry of WTVM/WRBL/WVRK Tower
 FCC-Entry of Cusseta Richland Towers Tower

Towers in Georgia (U.S. state)
Buildings and structures in Chattahoochee County, Georgia
Radio masts and towers in the United States
1962 establishments in Georgia (U.S. state)
Towers completed in 1962